Acácio Pereira de  Mesquita (born 18 July 1909 in Porto - deceased 30 May 1945) was a Portuguese footballer who played as midfielder.

External links 
 
 

1909 births
1945 deaths
Portuguese footballers
Association football midfielders
Primeira Liga players
FC Porto players
Portugal international footballers
Footballers from Porto